Shuhan, shu han, or variation, may refer to:

Iran
Shuhan, also rendered as Shoohan or Shahun or Showhan, may refer to:

 Shuhan-e Olya (disambiguation)
 Shuhan-e Sofla (disambiguation)
 Shuhan Rural District, in Ilam Province

Other uses
 Shu Han, (蜀漢) 221–263, one of the states during the Three Kingdoms period in China

See also

Han shu (disambiguation)